Gerd Schubert (born 15 July 1943) is a German boxer. He competed in the men's flyweight event at the 1972 Summer Olympics. At the 1972 Summer Olympics he lost to Chawalit On-Chim of Thailand.

References

1943 births
Living people
German male boxers
Olympic boxers of West Germany
Boxers at the 1972 Summer Olympics
Boxers from Berlin
Flyweight boxers